Punkurí is an archaeological site in Nepeña District, in the province of Santa, Peru.

Archaeological sites in Peru